Mark Andrew Hardinges (born 5 February 1978) is an English cricketer. He is a right-handed batsman and a right-arm medium-pace bowler.

Having made his debut in 1999, Hardinges made important contributions for Gloucestershire and went to Western Australia in an effort to improve his cricket. He played in the 2001 Benson & Hedges Cup final taking one wicket. He was a regular player for his home county until 2008 when he joined Essex for whom he played Twenty20 cricket in 2009.

In 2010, Hardinges was selected as one of 21 players to form the first Unicorns squad to take part in the Clydesdale Bank 40 domestic one day competition against the regular first-class counties. The Unicorns were made up of 15 former county cricket professionals and 6 young cricketers looking to make it in the professional game.

References

External links
 

1978 births
Living people
Alumni of the University of Bath
English cricketers
Essex cricketers
Gloucestershire cricketers
People educated at Malvern College
Cricketers from Gloucester
Buckinghamshire cricketers
British Universities cricketers